This is a list of caliphal governors of Sijistan.

 Rabi ibn Ziyad al-Harithi 651-653 CE.
 Abd al-Rahman ibn Samura 653-665 CE.
 Ubayd Allah ibn Abi Bakra 671-673 CE.
 Abbad ibn Ziyad 673–680/81 CE.
 Yazid ibn Ziyad 680/81 CE.
 Talha ibn Abd Allah al-Khuza'i 683–684.
 Abd al-Aziz 684-685 CE.
 Abdallah ibn Umaiyah 693-694 CE.
 Ubayd Allah ibn Abi Bakra 698-699 CE.
 Ibn al-Ash'ath 699-700.
 Al-Ashhar ibn Bishr.
 Amr ibn Muslim/ Qutayba ibn Muslim circa 710 CE. 
 Mudrik ibn al-Muhallab 715-717 CE
 Yazid ibn al-Ghurayf, 725-726 CE
 Ibn Abi Burda -738 CE
 Ibrahim ibn Asim al-Uqayli 738-743 CE

References

Sources

 
Marshak, B.I., and N.N. Negmatov. "Sogdiana." History of Civilizations of Central Asia, Volume III: The Crossroads of Civilizations: A.D. 250 to 750. Eds. B.A. Litvinsky, Zhang Guang-da and R. Shabani Samghabadi. Paris: UNESCO Publishing, 1996. 

People of the Muslim conquest of Persia
Governors of Sistan
Umayyad governors of Sijistan